Protein transport protein Sec31A is a protein that in humans is encoded by the SEC31A gene.

The protein encoded by this gene is similar to the SEC31 protein from yeast. The yeast SEC31 protein is known to be a component of the COPII protein complex, which is responsible for vesicle budding from endoplasmic reticulum (ER). This protein was found to colocalize with SEC13, one of the other components of COPII, in the subcellular structures corresponding to the vesicle transport function. An immunodepletion experiment confirmed that this protein is required for ER-Golgi transport. Alternative splicing results in multiple transcript variants encoding different isoforms.

Halperin-Birk syndrome (HLBKS), a rare autosomal recessive neurodevelopmental disorder, is caused by a null mutation in the SEC31A gene.

References

Further reading 

 
 
 
 
 
 
 
 
 
 
 
 

Nuclear pore complex